Newswatch is a weekly BBC television programme presented by Samira Ahmed that provides a viewer and listener right-of-reply for BBC News. The programme was originally made in studio TC7 at BBC Television Centre, however in January 2013, the programme moved to New Broadcasting House in central London.

The programme 

The programme was launched in 2004 in response to the Hutton Inquiry, as part of an initiative to make BBC News more accountable. The programme is sometimes broadcast on the BBC News channel on Friday evenings at 7:45pm or 8:45pm, early Saturday at 3.45am, and Saturday mornings at 7:45am on BBC One during BBC Breakfast, or viewed online.

Format
The programme starts with the presenter introducing the main news story that viewers have complained about. After about six minutes, often including talking to the head of BBC News or someone responsible for the story, the next section of the programme is usually split between a few other news stories.

Presenter

In January 2013, Samira Ahmed succeeded Ray Snoddy as presenter of Newswatch. Snoddy had presented from the launch of the programme in 2004. Shaun Ley guest presented the programme for three episodes in April 2019. Rebecca Jones guest presented two editions of the programme in June 2019.

See also 

 Feedback, a similar programme for BBC radio
 Points of View

References

External links 

 

2010s British television series
2020s British television series
BBC television news shows
2004 British television series debuts